= Cambodian Industrial Food Union Federation =

Trade union federation for food workers in Cambodia

CIFUF
- Founded: 2003
- Location: Cambodia
- Members: 7,345 (2015)
- Affiliations: CUNIC

The Cambodian Industrial Food Union Federation (CIFUF) is a trade union federation of food, restaurant, tobacco and informal economy workers in Cambodia. The union was established in 2003 and represents 7,345 members in nine local unions. CIFUF is affiliated with CUNIC.
